Baltimore Strike may refer to one of several strikes that have happened in Baltimore
 Baltimore railroad strike of 1877
 Baltimore police strike
 Baltimore municipal strike of 1974